Krush (Qoroş) is a rural locality (a selo) in Ozerkinsky Selsoviet, Karaidelsky District, Bashkortostan, Russia. The population was 175 as of 2010. There are 4 streets.

Geography 
Krush is located 63 km northeast of Karaidel (the district's administrative centre) by road. Ozerki is the nearest rural locality.

References 

Rural localities in Karaidelsky District